John Yuill may refer to:

John Yuill (footballer), Scottish professional footballer
John Yuill (tennis), South African tennis player